Mian Ab or Miyanab or Miyan Ab may refer to:
 Mian Ab, Chaharmahal and Bakhtiari
 Mian Ab, Khuzestan
 Miyan Ab Rural District, in Khuzestan Province
 Miyan Ab-e Shomali Rural District, in Khuzestan Province